California Dreaming is a 1979 American comedy-drama film starring Glynnis O'Connor, Dennis Christopher, Seymour Cassel and Tanya Roberts and directed by John D. Hancock.

Plot
A young man named Tony moves from Chicago to California for the summer. He quickly becomes adapted to the new pace of beach life, learning several lessons along the way.

Cast

Production
California Dreaming, a production of American International Pictures (AIP), could be considered a latter-day exemplar of the beach-party film genre that AIP pioneered in the 1960s. However, the film's producer Lou Arkoff, the son of AIP founder Samuel Z. Arkoff, stated a desire to "move [AIP] toward more serious, insightful and creative projects" rather than the exploitation films favored by his father, saying specifically of California Dreaming: "My concern is that this doesn't become 'Beach Blanket Bingo'."

Filming for California Dreaming began on October 17, 1977 at Santa Monica State Beach, the film's purported setting. However, most of the movie's footage would be shot at Pismo Beach, with Avila Beach also serving as a locale.

The script written by Ned Wynn was entitled State Beach, which was the film's working title (with Golden State mentioned as a possible alternative). Director John D. Hancock wanted to change the title to California Dreaming, and the new title was confirmed in December 1977. Permission for the title was obtained from the copyright holders of the song "California Dreamin'", though the film's storyline has no immediate parallels with the song's lyrics. The film's poster features the slogan "A state somewhere between fantasy and reality" under the title.

Filming was completed in December 1978. The film's budget was $2 million.

John D. Hancock said that during filming cast members' attraction to Tanya Roberts caused tension on the set.

Release
The planned July 1978 release of California Dreaming was postponed because of a perceived glut of similarly themed movies set for release that summer (most prominently Big Wednesday). A rescheduled October 1978 was also canceled. The film finally premiered with a December 27-January 1 engagement at a Yuma, Arizona theater; it was to AIP's advantage for taxation purposes to release the film before the end of 1978.

California Dreaming was given a limited release on March 16, 1979, and the release was expanded in the following two months. The release schedule was planned to coincide with the release of the film's soundtrack album, distributed by Casablanca Records. The version of "California Dreamin'" recorded by America that plays during California Dreaming's closing credits was issued as a single, spending eight weeks in the Billboard Hot 100 and peaking at #56.

References

External links

1979 films
1979 comedy-drama films
American comedy-drama films
American International Pictures films
1970s English-language films
Films directed by John D. Hancock
Films scored by Fred Karlin
Films set in California
Films shot in California
1970s American films